John Foster Sr. (1758–1827) was an English engineer, father of John Foster Jr. He was Senior Surveyor to the Corporation of Liverpool succeeding Henry Berry. In the early 1820s he was responsible for the extensive remodelling of Liverpool's Blue Coat School, adding the curved wall and new chapel to the rear. In 1824 he was succeeded as Senior Surveyor by his son while Jesse Hartley replaced him as dock engineer at Liverpool Dock Trustees.

During his time as dock engineer, Foster completed only one dock (Prince's Dock). He also converted Manchester Basin to an enclosed dock (Manchester Dock) and expanded several other docks including George's Dock and Queen's Dock. The warehouse at King's Dock was built by Foster.

References

Engineers from Liverpool
1758 births
1827 deaths